Sabrina Buchholz (born 5 March 1980 in Schmalkalden) is a German biathlete. She is the 2008 world champion in the mixed relay.

Career highlights

IBU World Championships
2008, Östersund,  1st at team relay (with Neuner / Birnbacher / Greis)
IBU World Junior Championships
2000, Hochfilzen,  1st at team relay (with Hartleb / Forberger)
2000, Hochfilzen,  2nd at individual race
2000, Hochfilzen,  1st at pursuit
2000, Hochfilzen,  1st at sprint
World Cup
2007, Pokljuka,  1st at team relay (with Glagow / Neuner / Henkel)
2008, Ruhpolding,  1st at team relay (with Hitzer / Neuner / Wilhelm)
European Championships
2002, Kontiolahti,  1st at team relay (with Menzel / Klein / Denkinger)
2004, Minsk,  3rd at team relay (with Echter / Menzel / R. Beer)
2005, Novosibirsk,  2nd at individual race
2006, Langdorf-Arbersee,  3rd at team relay (with Adler / Neuner / K. Beer)
2007, Bansko,  2nd at team relay (with Adler / Müller / Niziak)
European Cup
2003, Geilo,  2nd at sprint
2003, Geilo,  1st at pursuit
2003, Ridnaun-Val Ridanna,  1st at sprint
2004, Meribel,  1st at team relay (with Echter / Menzel / R. Beer)
2005, Ridnaun-Val Ridanna,  1st at team relay (with Niziak / Ertl / Denkinger)
2005, Obertilliach,  2nd at individual race
2006, Martell-Val Martello,  1st at pursuit
2006, Martell-Val Martello,  2nd at sprint
2006, Obertilliach,  1st at pursuit
2006, Obertilliach,  1st at sprint
2007, Nove Mesto,  3rd at pursuit
2007, Nove Mesto,  2nd at sprint
2007, Haute Maurienne,  1st sprint
2007, Haute Maurienne,  2nd pursuit
2007, Ridnaun-Val Ridanna,  1st sprint
2007, Ridnaun-Val Ridanna,  1st pursuit

External links
  
 
 
 

German female biathletes
1980 births
Living people
People from Schmalkalden
Biathlon World Championships medalists
Sportspeople from Thuringia